The  is a bus service operated by the Bus Service Division of the . It is also called .

The bureau mainly operates bus routes in the wards of Nagoya.

See also
List of bus operating companies in Japan

References

External links

 Transportation Bureau, City of Nagoya official website

Transport in Nagoya
Bus companies of Japan